Ncandu Falls is a waterfall in the Ncandu River in Northern KwaZulu-Natal, in South Africa close to the town of Newcastle, KwaZulu-Natal.

Waterfalls of South Africa
Landforms of KwaZulu-Natal